John Henry Richard Maunsell (born 1955) is a British-American neuroscientist who is the Albert D. Lasker Professor of Neurobiology at the University of Chicago. He is a fellow of the American Academy of Arts & Sciences and the American Association for the Advancement of Science. Formerly the editor-in-chief of The Journal of Neuroscience, as of 2021 he is a co-editor of the Annual Review of Vision Science.

Early life and education
John Henry Richard Maunsell was born in Great Baddow, Essex, England in 1955 younger son of Henry Ian Geoffrey Maunsell (1924-2013), of New Jersey, USA, an electronic engineer with Bell Telephone Laboratories, and Stella Christine, daughter of Leonard Vincent Labrow, of Moreton, Maybury Hill, Woking, Surrey. The Maunsell family are Irish landed gentry.
He attended Duke University for his bachelor's degree in zoology, graduating in 1977. He then attended the California Institute of Technology, graduating with a PhD in biology in 1982. Maunsell completed a postdoctoral research appointment at Massachusetts Institute of Technology with neuroscientist Peter Schiller.

Career
In 1985 Maunsell was hired as an assistant professor of physiology at the University of Rochester; he was promoted to associate professor in 1991. From 1992 to 2006 he was a professor of neuroscience at Baylor College of Medicine, followed by an endowed professorship at Harvard Medical School as the Alice and Rodman W. Moorhead III Professor of Neurobiology from 2006 to 2014. From 1997 to 2011 he was additionally an investigator at Howard Hughes Medical Institute. He joined the faculty of the University of Chicago in 2014, where he remains employed as of 2021 as the Albert D. Lasker Professor of Neurobiology. He is also the inaugural Director of the Grossman Institute for Neuroscience, Quantitative Biology and Human Behavior.

He was editor-in-chief of The Journal of Neuroscience from 2007 to 2014. As of 2021, he is a co-editor of the Annual Review of Vision Science.

Awards and honors
Maunsell was elected a fellow of the American Association for the Advancement of Science in 2002. In 2014 he was elected as a fellow of the American Academy of Arts & Sciences. In 2021, he was elected member of the U. S. National Academy of Sciences.

References

Living people
1955 births
People from Chelmsford
British neuroscientists
Duke University alumni
California Institute of Technology alumni
University of Rochester faculty
Baylor College of Medicine faculty
Harvard Medical School faculty
Howard Hughes Medical Investigators
University of Chicago alumni
Fellows of the American Academy of Arts and Sciences
Fellows of the American Association for the Advancement of Science
Members of the United States National Academy of Sciences
Annual Reviews (publisher) editors